The Buccaneer is a 1958 pirate-war film made by Paramount Pictures starring Yul Brynner as Jean Lafitte, Charles Boyer and Claire Bloom. Charlton Heston played a supporting role as Andrew Jackson, the second time that Heston played Jackson, having portrayed him earlier in the 1953 film The President's Lady.  The film was shot in Technicolor and VistaVision, the story takes place during the War of 1812, telling a heavily fictionalized version of how the privateer Lafitte helped in the Battle of New Orleans and how he had to choose between fighting for America or for the side most likely to win, the United Kingdom.

The movie's supporting cast featured Inger Stevens, Henry Hull, E. G. Marshall, Lorne Greene, Ted de Corsia, Ed Hinton, Douglass Dumbrille and Majel Barrett. (Ty Hardin was uncredited). Anthony Quinn directed the film.

Possibly as a film tie-in, Johnny Horton had a big success at the time with his version of the song The Battle of New Orleans.

Cast
 Yul Brynner as Jean Lafitte
 Claire Bloom as Bonnie Brown 
 Charles Boyer as Dominique You  
 Inger Stevens as Annette Claiborne
 Henry Hull as Ezra Peavey  
 E. G. Marshall as Gov. William C. C. Claiborne  
 Charlton Heston as Gen. Andrew Jackson  
 Lorne Greene as Mercier 
 Ted de Corsia as Capt. Rumbo 
 Douglass Dumbrille as Collector of the Port 
 Sir Lancelot as Scipio
 Robert Warwick as Capt. Lockyer 
 Paul Newlan as Capt. Flint
 Norma Varden as Madame Hilaire 
 Onslow Stevens as Phipps
 James Seay as Creole Militia Officer 
 Henry Brandon as British Major 
 Mike Mazurki as Tarsus
 Madame Sul-Te-Wan as Vendor 
 Ken Terrell as Pirate
 Majel Barrett as Townswoman #1
 Ty Hardin as Soldier (Uncredited)
 Cecil B. DeMille as Himself (uncredited)

Production
The Buccaneers budget was $6 million. $1.2 million was given for the promotion of the picture. Quinn was given five stars, fifty-five featured actors, 100 bit actors, 12,000 extras, 60,000 props, $100,000 worth of antique furniture, Spanish moss, and cypress trees.

Historical accuracy
Claiborne's only surviving daughter, Sophronie (or Sophronia) Louise Claiborne, was only two years old at the time of the battle. The romance with Lafitte is complete fiction.

The interactions between Jackson and Lafitte, including the seemingly dramatized but actually accurate depiction of Lafitte sneaking into Andrew Jackson's window, Lafitte and the British Royal Navy officers, as well as between Jackson and the "leading citizens" of New Orleans, are accurate.  About those scenes, screenwriter Jesse L. Lasky Jr. said that "the actual historic events in question are themselves so over the top that all I really had to do was line up the dialogue, and even then only some of it."  He added, "The only real job was shoe-horning a romance into it."

1938 film
The film is a remake of the 1938 film of the same name, which starred Fredric March and Akim Tamiroff (Boyer played Tamiroff's role in the remake). The earlier version was produced and directed by Cecil B. DeMille, but he was seriously ill by the time the 1958 version was made, so he was only the executive producer of the remake, leaving his then son-in-law, Anthony Quinn, to direct. It was the only film that Quinn ever directed. Henry Wilcoxon, DeMille's longtime friend, who made frequent appearances in his films, was the actual producer, and DeMille received screen credit as "supervised by Cecil B. Demille", though students of his films would probably find that his touch is obvious throughout the film.

Reception

Critical response
Staff writers for Variety wrote in their review: "Continuity-wise, Buccaneer is a scrambled affair in the early reels. Open to question, also, are the story angles in the screenplay which derives from a previous Buccaneer scenario put out by DeMille in 1938 and, in turn, from an adaptation of the original book, Lafitte the Pirate, by Lyle Saxon." In his book, Success in the Cinema Money Making Movies, John Howard Reid, states most reviews of the film left out the director's name, Quinn, like Time and Newsweek. The Time review states: "What (Henry) Wilcoxon and Quinn have produced is just a half-deflated imitation of the old man at his overblown best." The Newsweek review stated without criticizing anyone: "two hours of the most pretentious nonsense to lay claim to a moviegoer's spending money."

Release
The Buccaneer was released in New York City theatres during Christmas week of 1958. The film was released on DVD ON February 28, 2012, by Olive Films.

References

Citations

Sources

External links
 
 
 

1958 films
1958 directorial debut films
1950s English-language films
Paramount Pictures films
War of 1812 films
Films scored by Elmer Bernstein
Films set in New Orleans
Pirate films
Films directed by Anthony Quinn
American films based on actual events
Remakes of American films
American folklore films and television series
Films set in 1815
Films about Andrew Jackson
Films adapted into comics
Cultural depictions of Andrew Jackson
Cultural depictions of Jean Lafitte
1950s American films